is a feminine Japanese given name which can also be used as a surname.

Possible writings

Asami can be written using different kanji characters and can mean:
as a given name
麻美, "hemp, beauty"
朝美, "morning, beauty"
朝海, "morning, sea"
The given name can also be written in hiragana or katakana.
as a surname
浅見, "shallow, look"
浅海, "shallow sea"

People
 with the given name Asami
, Japanese singer
, Japanese sprinter
, Japanese snowboarder
, Japanese voice actress
, Japanese fashion model, actress, and singer
, Japanese AV Idol
, Japanese actress
, Japanese pop singer
, Japanese female mixed martial artist
, Japanese pop singer
, Japanese actress
, Japanese musician
, Japanese voice actress
, Japanese voice actress
, Japanese voice actress
, Japanese actress and AV Idol
, Japanese composer, arranger, pianist and music producer
,   Japanese gravure idol
, Japanese voice actress
, Japanese manga artist
, Japanese professional Go player
, Japanese voice actress
, Japanese professional basketball player
Asami Zdrenka, English-Japanese pop singer.

with the surname Asami
, Japanese astronomer
, Japanese judoka.
, Japanese performing artist
, Japanese TV actress
, Japanese actress and mode
, the participant in the obstacle course competition show Kunoichi
, Japanese racecar driver
, Japanese adult video actress

Fictional characters
with the given name Asami
 Asami Matsumoto (朝海), a minor character in the anime and manga series Nana
 Asami Yamazaki (麻美), a central character from the 1999 Japanese horror film Audition
 Asami Sato is a character in the animated series The Legend of Korra.
 Asami Nakaoka is a character in the ongoing Japanese manga Highschool of the Dead, who made a brief but significant appearance for a few chapters.
 Asami Minagawa, a secondary character from Mushi-Uta.
Asami "Sam" Koizumi, a minor character in DC's animated series Young Justice.

with the family name Asami
 Chiaki Asami (浅見), a character in the manga series Sanctuary
 Ryuichi Asami (麻見), a character in the manga series Finder
 Saki Asami (浅海 サキ), a character in the manga series Puella Magi Kazumi Magica

Japanese feminine given names
Japanese-language surnames